"The Night Lands" is the second episode of the second season of HBO's medieval fantasy television series Game of Thrones. The episode is written by the showrunners David Benioff and D. B. Weiss, and directed by Alan Taylor. It was first released on April 2, 2012, via the online service HBO GO in some European countries, including the Netherlands, Poland and Slovenia. Cable television first broadcast it on April 8, 2012.

The plot continues with some of the storylines from the season premiere: the Night's Watch caravan heading to the Wall is interrupted by a pair of City Watch guards looking for Gendry, the Small Council receives the terms proposed by King in the North Robb Stark, Daenerys waits in the desert for the return of the three riders she had sent out, and Theon Greyjoy returns to his homeland of the Iron Islands.

"The Night Lands" was positively received by critics, who noted the many pivotal character moments as a highlight in the episode. In the United States, the episode achieved a viewership of 3.76 million in its initial broadcast. The episode is titled after the Dothraki language term for death.

Plot

At Dragonstone
Davos Seaworth and his son, Matthos, recruit the pirate Salladhor Saan and his fleet to join them in the war. Melisandre seduces Stannis Baratheon, promising him a son if he gives himself completely to the Lord of Light.

In King's Landing
Tyrion Lannister exchanges thinly veiled threats with Lord Varys. The Small Council ignores Robb Stark's peace terms, as well as the request by the Night's Watch for more men and their report of encounters with the undead. When City Watch Commander Lord Janos Slynt refuses to reveal who ordered the purge of King Robert Baratheon's bastard children, Tyrion exiles him to the Night's Watch, replacing him with Bronn. Cersei confronts Tyrion, who realizes King Joffrey Baratheon ordered the purge, warning his sister, "it will be difficult to rule over millions who want you dead."

In the Red Waste
Rakharo's horse returns to Daenerys Targaryen's camp carrying his severed head, leaving Irri devastated and explaining that his soul will never rest with the ancestors since they did not burn his body. Ser Jorah Mormont explains it is a message from another khal refusing to accept a woman's rule over a khalasar, and Daenerys vows revenge.

On the Iron Islands
Returning to his homeland, Theon Greyjoy tries to seduce a young woman, Yara. At Pyke, Theon presents his father Balon with Robb's offer that will make Balon King of the Iron Islands. Balon refuses, wishing to take his crown with Yara, revealed to be Theon's sister, at the helm of his fleet. Theon realises Balon's intention is to take the North for himself.

On the Kingsroad
City Watchmen search the caravan for Gendry but are turned away by Yoren. Gendry tells Arya Stark that he knows she is a girl, and she reveals she is actually Arya Stark after learning that her father met Gendry before he was executed.

Beyond The Wall
Samwell Tarly asks Jon Snow about taking Gilly, one of Craster's daughter-wives, with them but Jon refuses. Gilly is pregnant, and Jon wonders what happens to Craster's sons. That night, Jon follows Craster taking a newborn child into the woods, and sees a White Walker retrieve the baby, but Craster knocks Jon unconscious.

Production

Writing
The episode was written by David Benioff and D. B. Weiss, based on original material from George R. R. Martin's second book of the series, A Clash of Kings. It includes most of the plot from chapters Arya II, Tyrion II, Arya III, Theon I, part of Daenerys I, Tyrion III, part of Arya V, part of Tyrion V, part of Jon III and part of Theon II (chapters 6, 8–12, 19–20, 23–25 respectively).

One of the main deviations from the books was the removal of the character of the new commander of the City Watch, Ser Jacelyn Bywater, his role merged with the already introduced Bronn. Another character that was excluded was Aeron Damphair, who was not present to welcome his nephew Theon at the Iron Islands. Instead, he was received by his sister, in a scene that took place much later in the books.

Also, some scenes that are only subtly implied in the original were made explicit in the episode. The scenes depicting Craster delivering a newborn son to the White Walkers and the sexual relationship between Stannis and Melisandre were written into the show by the producers.

The episode was directed by Alan Taylor, making it the fourth episode he directed for the show. Taylor would direct three more episodes of the show, two of them in Season Two and one in Season Seven.

Casting
Theon Greyjoy's family is cast in this episode. The role of his father Balon Greyjoy, Lord of the Iron Islands, went to the English actor Patrick Malahide. The character of his sister was renamed from the original books (from Asha to Yara) in order to avoid confusion with the already established character Osha (the wildling captive at Winterfell), and Gemma Whelan was chosen to play the role. After seeing Whelan and Alfie Allen (Theon Greyjoy) acting together, the show creators assured that they made "an insanely good pair of siblings." Alfie Allen's sister, the English pop star Lily Allen, asserted that she had been offered the role of Yara Greyjoy, but had turned it down due to some scenes potentially being awkward to film. Alfie Allen, however, vehemently denied his sister's claims.

Also introduced, in this episode, are the three caged recruits, traveling with the Night's Watch caravan. The three characters were briefly seen in the last season's finale, played by uncredited extras. For this season they were, Andy Beckwith as Rorge, Gerard Jordan as Biter, and the German actor Tom Wlaschiha as the mysterious Jaqen H'ghar of the free city of Lorath. Wlaschiha had not known of the show before auditioning on tape from Berlin, but was able to screen a few episodes during a meeting with the producers and director Alan Taylor. He quickly became an enthusiast, reading the first books of the series within a couple of days.

Finally, the part of the Lyseni pirate Salladhor Saan went to Lucian Msamati. Msamati's physical appearance, a Black, British actor of Tanzanian descent, contrasts with Sallahdor's portrayal in the books, where he is described with the typical fair-haired and fair-skinned look of the free city of Lys.

Filming locations

The episode introduces the new location of Pyke, the Greyjoys' seat of power on the Iron Islands. Scenes set there were filmed at Lordsport Harbour, Ballintoy, in Northern Ireland's County of Antrim. The filming at the Harbour took place on August 18, 19 and 22, 2011, and from August 15 there was a limited public access to the zone. The local shops and fishermen, who had to temporarily berth their boats at the nearby town of Ballycastle, were compensated by the production.

Other locations in Northern Ireland were used once again, including the interiors in the Paint Hall studio in Belfast.

Reception

Ratings
The ratings of the episode remained steady with the last week's season premiere. The number of viewers of the first airing reached 3.76 million viewers, with a rating of 1.9 in the relevant 18-49 demographic - just a little behind the series record of 3.9 reached in the last installment in what commentators considered a strong accomplishment. In the United Kingdom, the episode was seen by 0.851 million viewers on Sky Atlantic, being the channel's highest-rated broadcast that week.

The day after the release of the rating of this second episode HBO announced the renewal of the show for a third season.

Critical reception
"The Night Lands" received positive reviews from critics. Review aggregator Rotten Tomatoes surveyed 12 reviews of the episode and judged 83% of them to be positive with an average score of 8.5 out of 10. The website's critical consensus reads, "Moodier than the premiere and full of dark intrigue, 'The Night Lands' introduces viewers to exotic new locations in Westeros and delivers some pivotal character moments." Matt Fowler of IGN rated the episode 8 out of 10 and called it "a satisfying follow-up to the premiere filled with less-than-monumental happenings." He referred to the episode as "a great place-holder episode", comparing it to the first-season episode "The Kingsroad". In a review targeted at those who have read the source novels, The A.V. Clubs Emily VanDerWerff gave it an A- and remarked: "This is a strong and confident episode of the show, and it takes us easily enough from the Red Wastes to Beyond the Wall to Melisandre and Stannis having sex on a giant exposition table, seemingly without breaking a sweat." She also commented positively on the themes of the episode, which she believed were the definition of good leadership and the negative side of patriarchy. In addition, the reviewer thought that the episode was indicative of the series turning from "a ridiculously entertaining show" to "something on the level of Breaking Bad or Mad Men.

On the other hand, WhatCulture's Patrick Koch was more critical of the episode. In his ranking of the first 40 Game of Thrones episodes (seasons 1-4), Koch placed "The Night Lands" at number 40, calling the Greyjoy plotline on Pyke "supremely non-interesting." Simon Abrams, writing for Slant Magazine, gave the episode a mixed review compared to the premiere, referring to "The Night Lands" as "a bit of a let-down" and "not as thematically cogent as last week's episode." In his episode recap for Entertainment Weekly, James Hibberd noted that the amount of sex in the first season of Game of Thrones was "probably the biggest point of debate among viewers" and observed that this episode "might have been the most sex-focused hour yet." Indeed, the episode was cut short by the Dubai-based broadcaster Etisalat during its initial airing due to concerns about nudity. According to The National, previous episodes had been aired on Etisalat with "minimal editing."

References

External links 

 "The Night Lands" at HBO.com
 

Game of Thrones (season 2) episodes
2012 American television episodes
Television episodes written by David Benioff and D. B. Weiss